The 2008 Bucharest Summit or the 20th NATO Summit was a NATO summit organized in the Palace of the Parliament, Bucharest, Romania on 2 – 4 April 2008. 

Among other business, Croatia and Albania were invited to join the Alliance. The Former Yugoslav Republic Of Macedonia was not invited to join NATO due to its ongoing naming dispute with Greece. Georgia and Ukraine had hoped to join the NATO Membership Action Plan, but, while welcoming the two countries’s aspirations for membership and agreeing that "these countries will become members of NATO", the NATO members decided to review their request in December 2008.

Prior protests in Brussels 
Protests against NATO's role in "promoting war" were held at NATO's HQ in Brussels two weeks before the summit, and in Bucharest. Protesters targeted the renewed determination of NATO to use nuclear weapons and NATO's backing of the US anti-missile shield.

Summit agenda

As said by Craig Kennedy in an introduction to the NATO Bucharest summit and from the NATO summit program.

 NATO's capability and capacity.
 The tensions in the Russia-NATO relationship (3 and 4 April).
 Cyber security.
 EU-NATO partnership.
 Energy security.
 Stability of the Western Balkans.
 The mission in Afghanistan (2 and 3 April).
 NATO enlargement (Albania, former Yugoslav republics Croatia and Macedonia).
 NATO Action Plan membership (Georgia and Ukraine) (4 April).
 Moldova's future in NATO.

Host

Romania competed for the organization of this summit with Portugal, which initially was scheduled to host the summit in 2006, but eventually conceded in favor of Latvia, which held the 2006 Riga Summit. Romania received support from the United States, and U.S. Under Secretary of State R. Nicholas Burns said in December 2006 that Romania deserved the honor to hold this event due to its contribution to the Alliance's common effort in the War in Afghanistan and for stability in the Iraq War. Romania has been a member of NATO since 14 March 2004.

Non-invitation 

An invitation to join the Alliance was not extended to the Former Yugoslav Republic Of Macedonia (FYROM). Greece had threatened on several occasions to veto the country's NATO bid due to the longstanding naming dispute over the latter's name. The last UN proposal before the summit was the name "Republic of Macedonia (Skopje)", which was rejected by Greece. Athens argues that use of the name "Macedonia" implies territorial claims on its own region of Macedonia. Skopje denies this, citing constitutional amendments that specifically exclude "territorial pretensions". NATO officials said the country could begin talks on joining the alliance as soon as it had resolved its dispute with Greece.

While under the terms of the Interim Accord, signed between the two parties in 1995, Athens agreed not to block "membership in international, multilateral and regional organizations and institutions" under the FYROM acronym, Greece expected that the country would immediately request recognition by its constitutional name once it gained entry into the organization. According to politicians in Skopje, Athens has directly breached the Interim Accord.

The governments that supported its membership bid argued that the country had completed the necessary reforms for membership, and that regional stability would be challenged if it did not join NATO. Conversely, Athens contends that although Skopje rejects territorial claims officially, in practice there have been numerous irredentist provocations by high government officials, schoolbooks, and other governmental publications. Senior officials in Skopje asserted that the country had fulfilled NATO requirements to join and was being "punished" for its identity.

After an application for ruling submitted after this Summit by FYROM against Greece on this matter before the International Court of Justice, on 5 December 2011 the Court ruled that Greece had indeed breached the accords and was wrong to do so.

Russian presence

Russian President Vladimir Putin was invited to the summit, and he arrived on the second day (3 April) to participate in bilateral NATO–Russia talks. He opposed the US plans to deploy missile defenses in Poland and the Czech Republic, which was discussed at the summit. Russia also opposed Georgia and Ukraine's NATO membership bids.

Outcome

Summary of 2 April
 German Minister of Foreign affairs Frank-Walter Steinmeier talked about Ukraine and Georgia and tried not to provoke Russia by doing so, as they are both on Russia's borders and are both former Soviet states. Romanian President Traian Băsescu said Romania's approach to the relationship with Russia was to "leave behind the Cold War logic."
 U.S. President George W. Bush had a meeting at Neptun with President Băsescu about visas for one another's countries and working on organising bilateral relationships. President Băsescu claimed Romania deserved to have better relations with the US as it had sent troops to Iraq and Afghanistan and had worked with the US.
 NATO Secretary General Jaap de Hoop Scheffer opened the 'Securing our future' exhibition. The display 'Defence against terrorism' was launched in the same exhibition and there were talks about NATO's involvement in Iraq and Afghanistan and making it a success.
 United States, Canada, Poland, Romania, the Czechs and the Baltic States, strongly supported Ukraine and Georgia becoming NATO action plan members; however, they was strongly opposed by Germany, France, Italy, Spain, the Netherlands and Belgium.<ref
name="MacKay"></ref> Germany was more focused on reconciliation, on the dependence from Russian resources. Also, there were concerns with respect to governance and corruption within the both countries, or their ability to pull out of nefarious influence in the CIS. "Ukraine is seen by Russia as part of its own historic and cultural domain," Dutch politician warned. The British judgment is that, although there was full support for both Ukraine and Georgia, the question of when they joined should remain in the balance.

 President Bush said he is "satisfied with the NATO commitment to Afghanistan". Countries such as France and Romania promised to send more troops to support the NATO mission in Afghanistan.
 Jaap de Hoop Scheffer and Danish Prime Minister Anders Fogh Rasmussen launched a new web-based television channel meant to improve understanding of the Alliance roles, operation and missions at the NATO Summit in Bucharest.

Summary of 3 April
 A consensus was reached on Croatia and Albania: the two countries were invited to begin accession talks to join the Alliance.
 the Former Yugoslav Republic Of Macedonia's NATO bid was not accepted due to the name dispute with Greece. However Jaap de Hoop Scheffer said that the invitation will be offered to Skopje authorities "as soon as possible, as soon as a solution will be found". FYROM officials expressed their disappointment and argued that the decision would undermine stability in the Balkans. All NATO members agreed in writing that FYROM would not be able to join the alliance until it has settled its dispute with Greece.
 The Alliance did not offer a Membership Action Plan to Georgia or Ukraine, largely due to the opposition of Germany and France, but pledged to review the decision in December 2008. Even though Georgia was not offered MAP, it welcomed the decision and said "The decision to accept that we are going forward to an adhesion to NATO was taken and we consider this is a historic success". However, the Summit Declaration stated: "NATO’s door will remain open to European democracies willing and able to assume the responsibilities and obligations of membership, in accordance with Article 10 of the Washington Treaty.  We reiterate that decisions on enlargement are for NATO itself to make. [...] NATO welcomes Ukraine’s and Georgia’s Euro-Atlantic aspirations for membership in NATO.  We agreed today that these countries will become members of NATO.  Both nations have made valuable contributions to Alliance operations.  We welcome the democratic reforms in Ukraine and Georgia and look forward to free and fair parliamentary elections in Georgia in May.  MAP is the next step for Ukraine and Georgia on their direct way to membership.  Today we make clear that we support these countries’ applications for MAP."
 Nicolas Sarkozy of France confirmed he would send a battalion of troops (around 800) to the East of Afghanistan, to ensure Canada could remain in the Kandahar province. Prime Minister Stephen Harper was threatening to remove Canada from the combat mission if another 1000 troops were not sent as reinforcements.
 President Sarkozy also said that France could be reintegrated into the NATO military command at the next Alliance Summit in 2009, after it left the NATO military command in 1966.
 Bosnia and Herzegovina and Montenegro started the NATO intense dialogue phase and the alliance is thinking of co-operating with Serbia too.
 Vladimir Putin, the President of the Russian Federation, arrived in Bucharest to participate in Friday's NATO-Russia Council session. President Putin will present to the members of the Alliance Moscow's point of view regarding the future collaboration in the Council, and the challenges that the contemporary world faces. President Putin attended the summit with a positive attitude and wanted to avoid the disputes relating to recognition of the Kosovo province or the missile shield, and the speech of the Russian President was expected to be moderate.
 NATO announced its support for the territorial integrity, independence and sovereignty of Armenia, Azerbaijan, Georgia and Moldova.
 Malta re-joined the NATO Partnership for Peace after leaving it once before in October 1996.

Summary of 4 April
 President Vladimir Putin invited Romanian President Băsescu to visit Russia at dinner. The two leaders agreed upon a bilateral meeting. During the dinner, President Putin had a range of meetings with the US President George W. Bush with whom he discussed about the meeting in Sochi set for 6 April, with German Chancellor Angela Merkel, with UN Secretary General Ban Ki-moon, who is expected in Russia on 9 April, and with President of the European Commission, José Manuel Durão Barroso.
 Russia signed an agreement with NATO permitting transit across Russia of non-military equipment, food products, fuel and transport vehicles to forces in Afghanistan.
 NATO and Russia disagreed over Kosovo and no consensus was reached. Jaap de Hoop Scheffer said that "The debate on Kosovo should continue because we had a round of different opinions".

After the summit
 Poland claimed it was satisfied with the NATO summit. The Polish delegation at the NATO summit in Bucharest was satisfied with the Organisation's declaration supporting the deployment of the US anti-missile shield in Europe, Sławomir Nowak, the head of PM's political cabinet, has said.
 Russian President Putin was pleased about the alliance deciding not to invite Georgia and Ukraine to the Membership Action Plan at least for the time being.
 NATO Spokesman, James Appathurai, has spoken about the positive results of the high level reunion concerning the Alliance enlargement and NATO missile defence, which will be complementary to the American one. He was pleased about Albania and Croatia. He also said that the Former Yugoslav Republic Of Macedonia is still at the "alliance's door" and will be invited to join NATO as soon as the naming dispute is resolved.

Member states leaders and other dignitaries in attendance

Non-member states and organisations

References

External links

 Official Website
 Bucharest Summit Declaration Issued by the Heads of State and Government participating in the meeting of the North Atlantic Council in Bucharest on 3 April 2008
 ISAF's Strategic Vision Declaration by the Heads of State and Government of the Nations contributing to the UN-mandated NATO-led International Security Assistance Force (ISAF) in Afghanistan
 2008 Vilnius NATO meeting
 FYR of Macedonia after Bucharest: avoiding another European failure in the Balkans, Opinion by Aleksandar Matovski, June 2008, European Union Institute for Security Studies

Summit of 2008
2008 Bucharest summit
2008 in Romania
2008 in politics
Diplomatic conferences in Romania
21st-century diplomatic conferences (NATO)
2008 in international relations
2008 conferences
21st century in Bucharest
Romania and NATO
April 2008 events in Europe